Nzega District is one of the seven districts of the Tabora Region of Tanzania. It is bordered to the north by Shinyanga Region, to the south and southwest by Uyui District and to the east by Igunga District. Its administrative seat is the town of Nzega.

According to the 2002 Tanzania National Census, the population of Nzega District was 417,097.

According to the 2012 Tanzania National Census, the population of Nzega District was 502,252.

Transport
Paved Trunk road T3 from Morogoro to the Rwanda border and T8 from Tabora to Mwanza pass through the district. These roads meet in Nzega town.

The Tanzanian Central Line train - from Tabora to Mwanza - passes through the district from south to north. A train station is located in Bukene.

Administrative subdivisions
As of 2012, Nzega District was administratively divided into 37 wards.

Wards

 Budushi
 Bukene
 Igusule
 Ijanija
 Ikindwa
 Isagenhe
 Isanzu
 Itilo
 Itobo
 Kahamanhalanga
 Karitu
 Kasela
 Lusu
 Magengati
 Mambali
 Mbogwe
 Miguwa
 Milambo Itobo
 Mizibaziba
 Mogwa
 Muhugi
 Mwakashanhala
 Mwamala
 Mwangoye
 Nata
 Ndala
 Nkiniziwa
 Nzega Mjini
 Nzegandogo
 Puge
 Semembela
 Shigamba
 Sigili
 Tongi
 Uduka
 Utwigu
 Wela

Sources
 Nzega District Homepage for the 2002 Tanzania National Census

References

Districts of Tabora Region